RAF Bognor (also known as Bognor Advanced Landing Ground (A.L.G.)) is a former Royal Air Force Advanced Landing Ground  north of Bognor, West Sussex, England.

History 
Survey work on the site was undertaken in "mid-1942", with construction beginning in early 1943, completed by the Royal Canadian Engineers. Bognor was one of 82 planned Operation Hadrian sites planned with only 26 being built. The original budget for the site was £20,500. The airfield became operational on 1 June 1943 with two intersecting Sommerfield track runways. The site was under the control of RAF Tangmere located four miles further north. 

The site was originally a training site for aircrews to practise operating with few facilities, however, in Autumn 1943, extra over blister hangars were installed. These provided shelter for most aircraft that were stationed at Bognor, little accommodation was provided for the aircrews who lived in tented camps. The site was used as a forward staging base for a number of fighter and ground attack units for the D-Day assault, however, these soon moved to back to Tangmere and were replaced by 83 Group and 1310 Flight. 1310 flew Ansons from Bognor in an air ambulance and medical supply capacity to the advancing forces on the French coastline.

83 Group left the site in late September 1944 and need for the airfield ceased to exist. Runway removal works were carried out during the Autumn of 1944 and by early 1945, the site had been returned to its original owners. Parts of the site have now been built over by the expanding Bognor Regis or returned to farmland with few noticeable remnants of the airfield remaining.

Units 

Additional units:
 No. 122 Airfield RAF
 No. 132 (Norwegian) (Fighter) Wing RAF
 No. 2765 Squadron RAF Regiment
 No. 2893 Squadron RAF Regiment
 No. 2894 Squadron RAF Regiment
 No. 3205 Servicing Commando
 No. 3207 Servicing Commando

References

Citations

Bibliography

Royal Air Force stations in West Sussex
Royal Air Force stations of World War II in the United Kingdom